Kemambo is a ward in Tarime District, Mara Region of northern Tanzania, East Africa. In 2016 the Tanzania National Bureau of Statistics report there were 14,718 people in the ward, from 13,338 in 2012.

Villages / neighborhoods 
The ward has 3 villages and 29 hamlets.

 Kewanja
 Bukube
 Gonsara
 Kegonche
 Kemambo
 Kenyaitanka
 Magena
 Mjini Kati
 Nyabikondo
 Nyaiheto
 Mrito
 Keghati
 Keisankwe
 Kengoka
 Kumchongome
 Mabera Senta
 Miriminsi
 Morongo Senta
 Nyabiherero
 Nyambeho
 Nyangebo
 Rorya
 Kerende
 Isakahembe
 Malera
 Mogosi
 Ng'eng'i
 Ntimaro
 Nyabuchinchibu
 Nyamako
 Nyameng'osa
 Nyankomogo

References

Tarime District
Mara Region